Buginese is a Unicode block containing characters for writing the Buginese language of Sulawesi.

History
The following Unicode-related documents record the purpose and process of defining specific characters in the Buginese block:

References 

Unicode blocks